Chuanshan is a district of Suining, Sichuan Province, People's Republic of China. The district is the government seat of Suining city and also its main urban area. The population in 2012 was 700,000.

It was established in 2003 when the Shizhong District of Suining was split into Anju District and Chuanshan District.

References

External links
 Administrative divisions of Chuanshan

Districts of Sichuan
Suining